Philippe Pottier (9 July 1938 in Monthey, Switzerland – 22 September 1985) was a Swiss footballer.

References

External links
 
 Philippe Pottier at Weltfussball.de  

1938 births
1985 deaths
Swiss men's footballers
Switzerland international footballers
Swiss Super League players
Stade Français (association football) players
Angers SCO players
Servette FC players
Ligue 1 players
1962 FIFA World Cup players
Swiss football managers
Étoile Carouge FC players
People from Monthey
Étoile Carouge FC managers
Association football midfielders
Sportspeople from Valais